The Isaac H. Lionberger House at 3630 Grandel Square in Midtown St. Louis, Missouri, is the last private residence designed by noted American architect Henry Hobson Richardson. Designed in 1885–86, the building was built after Richardson's death. It was built for Isaac H. Lionberger, a well-known St. Louis lawyer who later became Assistant Attorney General of the United States.

The Lionberger House became a St. Louis Landmark in 1975.  In 2005, the house was restored and divided into office and residential space.

References

Landmarks of St. Louis
Henry Hobson Richardson buildings
Richardsonian Romanesque architecture in Missouri
Houses completed in 1887
1887 establishments in Missouri
Buildings and structures in St. Louis
Tourist attractions in St. Louis